Endochironomus is a genus of non-biting midges in the subfamily Chironominae of the bloodworm family Chironomidae. It is found throughout Europe and North America.

Species
E. albipennis (Meigen, 1830)
E. nigricans (Johannsen, 1905)
E. oldenbergi Goetghebuer, 1932
E. stackelbergi Goetghebuer, 1935
E. subtendens (Townes, 1945)
E. tendens (Fabricius, 1775)

References

Chironomidae
Diptera of Europe